Dmytro Sergiyovich Vorobey (born 10 May 1985) is a Belarusian-born Ukrainian former footballer.

Career
He played for Ukraine at 2002 UEFA European Under-17 Football Championship, 2004 UEFA European Under-19 Football Championship and 2005 FIFA World Youth Championship.

External links

FIFA.com

1985 births
Living people
People from Mazyr
Ukrainian footballers
Belarusian footballers
Ukrainian expatriate footballers
Expatriate footballers in Belarus
Ukraine youth international footballers
Ukraine under-21 international footballers
Association football midfielders
Ukrainian Premier League players
FC RUOR Minsk players
FC Borysfen-2 Boryspil players
FC Dynamo Kyiv players
FC Dynamo-2 Kyiv players
FC Dynamo-3 Kyiv players
FC Arsenal Kyiv players
FC Zorya Luhansk players
FC Mariupol players
FC Kryvbas Kryvyi Rih players
FC Naftovyk-Ukrnafta Okhtyrka players
FC Obolon-Brovar Kyiv players
FC Poltava players
FC Slavia Mozyr players
FC Kolos Zachepylivka players
Sportspeople from Gomel Region